An Inn of Court is training and professional association of lawyers, in particular:
For barristers
 Inn of Court (England and Wales), one of four bodies based in London
 King's Inns, Dublin, Ireland
 Northern Ireland Inn of Court, Belfast
Other
 American Inns of Court, United States forums discussing ethics, skills, and professionalism

See also
 Bar council, a regulatory association often linked to one or more Inns of Court
 Inns of Chancery, for clerks of chancery, associated with the London Inns of Court